Lulu Rouge is a Danish duo consisting of DJ T.O.M. and DJ Buda, both well-known names in the club and electronica scene.

T.O.M. has been Trentemøller's permanent sidekick for several years and is also the man behind ArtRebels Rec., which is a part of ArtRebels network with a focus on design, art and music.

Buda is a DJ and producer and has worked with names like Bliss, Laid Back, DJ These, Ganga, Télépopmusik, Phil Mison and Sergio Mendes. He is also part of the chill-out group Banzai Republic.

Lulu Rouge has recently had a hand in the new albums from both Fagget Fairys, Camille Jones and Joker.

Discography

Albums 
2008: Bless You
2013: The Song Is In the Drum

References

Danish musical duos